Jeffrey Caldwell Williams is an American actor of film, stage, and screen. He is perhaps best known from his role as Lewis Niles, a series regular on the ABC television drama Birdland.

External links
 
 New York Times Interview
New York Times Review
 Huffington Post Review

American male film actors
American male stage actors
American male television actors
Living people
Male actors from California
Sarah Lawrence College alumni
20th-century American male actors
21st-century American male actors
Year of birth missing (living people)